Coleotrochus rex is a species of small sea snail, a marine gastropod mollusk in the family Trochidae, the top snails.

Description
The shells of most species of sea snails are spirally coiled. The height of the shell attains 15 mm, its diameter 18 mm.

Distribution
This marine species is endemic to New Zealand and occurs off Three Kings Islands.

References

 Image of the holotype of the species, N.Z. government site
 Spencer, H.G.; Marshall, B.A.; Maxwell, P.A.; Grant-Mackie, J.A.; Stilwell, J.D.; Willan, R.C.; Campbell, H.J.; Crampton, J.S.; Henderson, R.A.; Bradshaw, M.A.; Waterhouse, J.B.; Pojeta, J. Jr (2009). Phylum Mollusca: chitons, clams, tusk shells, snails, squids, and kin, in: Gordon, D.P. (Ed.) (2009). New Zealand inventory of biodiversity: 1. Kingdom Animalia: Radiata, Lophotrochozoa, Deuterostomia. pp. 161–254

rex
Gastropods of New Zealand
Gastropods described in 1998